2011 in professional wrestling describes the year's events in the world of professional wrestling.

List of notable promotions 
These promotions held notable shows in 2011.

Calendar of notable shows

January

February

March

April

May

June

July

August

September

October

November

December

Accomplishments and tournaments

AAA

Ring of Honor

TNA

WWE

WWE Hall of Fame

Slammy Awards

Awards and honors

Pro Wrestling Illustrated

Wrestling Observer Newsletter

Wrestling Observer Newsletter Hall of Fame

Wrestling Observer Newsletter awards

Title changes

AAA

NJPW

ROH

TNA

WWE 
 – Raw
 – SmackDown
Prior to the end of the first WWE brand extension in August, Raw and SmackDown each had a world championship and a secondary championship, while the women's championship and male tag team championship were shared across the two brands.

Debuts
 March 2 – Neko Nitta
 May 4 – Trans-Am Hiroshi
 June 1 – Solo Darling
 June 18 – Marius Al-Ani
 June 19 - Bandido
 June 26 – Saki Kashima
 July 7 – Cameron
 August 7 – Rabbit Miu
 September 7 – Punch Tominaga
 October 22 – Gianni Valletta
 October 23 – Jason Lee
 November 24 – Koji Doi
 December 18 – Summer Rae

Retirements

 Krissy Vaine (September 2000 – 2011) (returned to wrestling in 2019) 
 Taylor Wilde (June 2003 – February 5, 2011) (returned to Impact Wrestling on April 25, 2021 at the Rebellion)
 Pierre Carl Ouellet (1987-February 8, 2011) (returned to wrestling in 2016) 
 Edge (1992 – April 11, 2011) (was medically cleared in 2020 and returned in that year's Men's Royal Rumble match)
 Gypsy Joe (1951-January 7, 2011)
 Dave Kidney (1950s-January 28, 2011) 
 Estrella Blanca (1954-April 17, 2011) 
 Michelle McCool (November 18, 2004 – May 1, 2011) (brief return in 2018 - Royal Rumble and WWE Evolution)
 Chyna (1995 – May 15, 2011)
 Roddy Piper (1969–August 12, 2011)
 Brett DiBiase (July 22, 2008 – August 22, 2011)
 Daizee Haze (March 29, 2002 – October 1, 2011)
 Daikokubō Benkei (November 10, 1994 – October 23, 2011)
 Maryse (July 10, 2006 – October 28, 2011) (as a professional wrestler) (returned to WWE in April 2016 to become her husband's manager/valet and has had a couple of one-off tag team matches teaming with her husband, including one at WrestleMania 33)
 Takeshi Rikio (May 28, 2000 – November 27, 2011)
 Nigel McGuinness (September 1999 – December 17, 2011)
 Brent Albright (October 10, 1998 – December 17, 2011)

Deaths

January 1 - Verne Langdon, 69
 January 7 – Val Puccio, 45
 January 23 - Jack LaLanne, 96
 January 26 - Shawn Osborne, 34  
 February 2 - Wolf, 38 
 March 17 - Fabián el Gitano, 39
 March 20 – Oliver Humperdink, 62
 April 9 - Chip Fairway, 38
 April 11 - Larry Sweeney, 30
 May 20 – Randy Savage, 58
June 21 - Tim Burke, 50
 August 11 – Scott LeDoux, 62
 August 20 – Rafael Halperin, (b. 1924) 86 or 87
 August 25 – Donna Christianello, 69
 September 6 – Little Tokyo, 70
 September 20 - Johnny Barend, 82
 October 11 – Doctor X, 43
 October 29 - Jimmy Savile, 84
 November 10 - Killer Karl Kox, 80
 November 22 - Bison Smith, 38
 December 21 - Umanosuke Ueda, 71

See also
List of NJPW pay-per-view events
List of ROH pay-per-view events
List of TNA pay-per-view events
List of WWE pay-per-view events

References

 
professional wrestling